Religion and beliefs occupy an important place in the daily life of the nation of Senegal. Many denominations of the religion of Islam (the largest faith) are represented. Christians (principally Catholics) represents 3.3%. Other belief's are officially practiced by 0.1% of the population, particularly Serer, but members of other religions also often partake in traditional practices.

Religious freedom is protected in Senegal by law. Senegalese culture, in general, is religiously tolerant.

Major religions in Senegal

Islam 

About 97% of the Senegalese population is Muslim, and many denominations of this faith are practised. Approximately 1% of the Muslim population practices Ahmadiyya. Though mainstream Muslims see Ahmadis as heretic.  Sufism is represented in Senegal by the following brotherhoods: Tijanism, Mouridism, Qadiriyya, and Layenism. More recently, the NabyAllah movement has emerged and constructed the Mosque of the Divinity in Ouakam.

The Layenes are a Muslim brotherhood based in Mahdism. This group originated in Yoff, a Lebou village that has become a commune d'arondissement of Dakar. The founder is Seydina Limamou Laye. He began his prédication May 24, 1883, at the age of 40, presenting himself as the Imam of "Bien Guidés" or "imamoul Mahdi." He taught and preached religious law and worship "clean and sincere," removed from the traditions that he judged were not conforming to Islam.

Tijanism (Tarîqah Tijâniyyah) is the most important Sufi brotherhood in Senegal. In Senegal, the principal holy city of Tijanism is Tivouane, the home of marabout Malick Sy (d. 1922). Sy left a legacy of pacifist teachings. Il y a aussi Sokone Avec El Hadji Amadou Déme (1895-1973). Kaolack is another important city, for being the seat of marabout Baye Niass (1900-1975) who also taught a pacifist message. The first propagators were Oumar Tall who tried to lead a holy war (1852-1864) against the French and Mouhammadoul Hâmet BA. After the 2002 general census of the Senegalese population, the followers of Tijianism constitute around 60% of all Senegalese, making it the most represented brotherhood in the country.

The Mouride constitute one of the most important brotherhoods in Senegal, and the most important Sufi brotherhood in Sub-Saharan Africa. The religious center of Mourides is the city of Touba, which houses one of the largest mosques in Africa. The founder of the Mouride brotherhood is Marabout Ahmadou Bamba (1853–1927). Each year, the Mourides commemorate the exile of Bamba during Magal, celebrated in the holy city of Touba. Each year, not less than two million people make this pilgrimage. Mourides constitute around 28% of the Senegalese population.

The Qadiriyya brotherhood is the oldest in Senegal, founded by the Sufi mystic Abd al Qadir al-Jilani in the 12th century. Qadiriyya constitute around 6% of the Senegalese population.

Shia Islam is the dominant religion among the Lebanese community of Senegal. Since the 1970s, the number of native Senegalese Shi'i Muslims has been growing significantly.

Christianity 
Primarily found in the south of Senegal, in the Casamance region, Christians are largely of Serer heritage. They are also found in the large cities of Senegal, such as Dakar and Saint-Louis. Senegalese Christians have a site of pilgrimage at Popenguine. The Dakar Cathedral was constructed at the beginning of the 20th century by father Daniel Brottier, founder of the orphelins apprentis d'Auteuil.

Protestantism is equally represented, among others, by the Protestant Church of Senegal.

Other beliefs

Traditional African religions like the Serer religion (A ƭat Roog) are adhered to by devout worshippers of Roog – the supreme deity in Serer religion. The Serer ethnic group who adhere to the tenets of Serer religion (including those Senegalese who syncretize) honour the Serer pangool and have ancient rituals and festivals devoted to them. The religious affairs of Serer religion devotees are usually headed by the Saltigue (the Serer priestly class) which in ancient times was the preoccupation of the Serer lamanic class.  Some of these religious festivals or ceremonies include the Ndut (rite of passage), Xooy (divination festival once a year in Fatick), and the Raan festival. Senegalese hold several ancient beliefs, such as small efforts of 'thanks' or demands, such as protection from water. They also place great importance on the Baobab tree, which is known as the "House of the Spirits." The baobab tree along with other sacred trees figure prominently in the Serer creation narrative. Among the Jola people, some religious festivals include the Samay, Kumpo and the Niasse.

Youth religiosity in Senegal

Religion is an integral part of daily life in Senegal, and this occurs very differently for adults and youths. Though many standard practices such as the celebration of large Senegalese religious holidays like Tabaski  maintain importance for Senegalese people of all generations, other practices such as daily prayer and abstinence from drinking and drugs take on different roles for Senegalese youth than for their parents. But along with youths who have liberalized their understanding of religion, there are many Senegalese youth  who have made changes of a more fundamentalist nature. Many Senegalese youth are reinstating earlier understandings of Islam, in many instances incorporating religion into their lives to a greater extent than that of their parents.

Changes in religiosity

A notable sign of changing generational levels of religiosity is how youth have changed their interactions with the national political system. On one hand, an increase in religiosity of Senegalese youth has caused them to promote an increased level of religious involvement in political decision-making. Conversely, many youth-led political movements are associated with groups of young people who tend to deviate from the religious expectations of their parents, partaking in alcohol consumption as well as elements of hip hop culture. For example, the Y'en a Marre ("Fed Up") movement was developed in January 2011 in response to the government inefficiency and youth un-involvement in Senegal was and was almost entirely youth-driven.

On the other hand, many Senegalese youth movements have centered on increasing the role of religion in political systems, particularly at the university level. Many student organizations have been created to attempt to promote these traditional values to Senegalese public life and politics. These groups include the Hizbut-Tarqiyyah, and the Association Musulmane des Etudiants d'Afrique Noire (AMEAN). Throughout the 1960s and 70s this upturn in religiosity was seen through the building of new mosques, and an increase in attention on Islamic organizations and news publications.

These movements have many sources of inspiration, some local and some international. Scholars have claimed that it is sometimes a lack of access to resources that drive youth to use religion as a source of empowerment, as well as a justification for violence in certain instances. However, in Senegal in the 1990s Islamic revivalism originated largely from educated youths who had attended secular French schools.

The existing literature about youth religiosity and politics in West Africa focuses on males, since they tend to dominate roles of religious authority in Muslim structures. This bias makes it even more difficult to make any generalizations about youth religiosity, since it would frequently be disregarding the sentiments of a large portion of the population. But it is apparent that religion serves a very different function for youth of this generation than it did for the previous one, in a pattern that was certainly passed down from the one before.

See also
Demographics of Senegal
Islam in Senegal
Roman Catholicism in Senegal
Religion in the Gambia

References

Notes

Further reading
Cox, Pamela; Kessler, Richard. "'Après Senghor'--A Socialist Senegal?" African Affairs, Vol. 79, No. 316 (July 1980), pp. 327–342
"La tolérance religieuse, reflet de l'aspiration d'une nation à la démocratie : dans la vie et l'œuvre de quatre auteurs sénégalais : Birago Diop, Cheikh Anta Diop, Léopold S. Senghor, Abdoulaye Sadje," Fondation Konrad Adenauer, 2007, 65 p.
Markovitz, Irving Leonard. "Traditional Social Structure, the Islamic Brotherhoods, and Political Development in Senegal." The Journal of Modern African Studies 8.01 (1970): 73. Print.

 
Senegalese culture
Society of Senegal